Voltago Agordino (Ladin: Oltach) is a village and comune  (municipality) in the Province of Belluno, Veneto Region of Northeast Italy.

Voltago Agordino borders the following municipalities: Agordo, Gosaldo, Rivamonte Agordino, Taibon Agordino and Tonadico.

Demographic evolution

References

Cities and towns in Veneto